The European and African Zone is one of the three zones of regional Davis Cup competition in 2008.

In the European and African Zone there are four different groups in which teams compete against each other to advance to the next group.

Participating teams

Draw

Latvia and Georgia relegated to Group II in 2009.
Croatia, Netherlands, Switzerland, and Slovakia advance to World Group Play-off.

First Round Matches

Latvia vs. Macedonia

Switzerland vs. Poland

Second Round Matches

Croatia vs. Italy

Netherlands vs. Macedonia

Switzerland vs. Belarus

Georgia vs. Slovakia

First Round Play-offs Matches

Poland vs. Belarus

Second Round Play-offs Matches

Italy vs. Latvia

Belarus vs. Georgia

Europe Africa Zone Group I, 2008 Davis Cup
Davis Cup Europe/Africa Zone